Requiem Canticles is a 15-minute composition by Igor Stravinsky, for contralto and bass soli, chorus, and orchestra. Stravinsky completed the work in 1966, and it received its first performance that same year.

The work is a partial setting of the Roman Catholic requiem mass, with the six vocal movements in Latin. It is from Stravinsky's serial period, but it has elements from all his stylistic periods. It was performed at Stravinsky's funeral five years after its initial premiere.

Orchestration
Requiem Canticles is scored for contralto and bass soloists, mixed chorus, and an orchestra consisting of 3 flutes (3rd doubles on piccolo), alto flute, 2 bassoons, 4 horns, 2 trumpets, 3 trombones, timpani (2 performers), 2 percussionists (xylophone, vibraphone, and tubular bells), harp, piano, celesta, and strings.

Structure
The piece consists of nine short movements:

Joseph N. Straus has discussed in detail Stravinsky's particular application of serial technique in the work, and his devising and use of a system of "rotational arrays" and "four-part arrays" in composing the work. David Smyth has noted Stravinsky's incorporation of the "B–A–C–H" (B–A–C–B) motif in the work.

Requiem Canticles is characteristic of Stravinsky's twelve-tone practice in that he preferred the inverse-retrograde (IR) to the typical retrograde-inverse (RI):

References

Further reading
 
 
 Samson, Jim (1995). "Igor Stravinsky: The Rite of Spring, etc". In Stravinsky: The Rite of Spring, Requiem Canticles, Canticum Sacrum (pp. 6–9) [CD booklet]. Colchester, Essex, England: Chandos Records.

External links
 Work details, Boosey & Hawkes
 Details and analysis, California Institute of Technology
 ; Philharmonia Orchestra, Simon Joly Chorale, Robert Craft conducting

Requiems
Compositions by Igor Stravinsky
1966 compositions